Lariats and Six-Shooters is a 1931 American pre-Code Western film directed by Alan James and starring Jack Perrin, Ann Lee and George Chesebro.

Cast
 Jack Perrin
 Ann Lee
 George Chesebro
 Art Mix
 Virginia Bell
 Lafe McKee
 Richard Cramer
 Olin Francis
 Jimmy Aubrey
 Gloria Joy

Plot
A sheriff's daughter and a prospector help a deputy sheriff capture a gang of smugglers.

References

Bibliography
 Michael R. Pitts. Poverty Row Studios, 1929–1940: An Illustrated History of 55 Independent Film Companies, with a Filmography for Each. McFarland & Company, 2005.

External links
 

1931 films
1931 Western (genre) films
American Western (genre) films
Films directed by Alan James
1930s English-language films
1930s American films